Hypselodoris rositoi is a species of sea slug or dorid nudibranch, a marine gastropod mollusc in the family Chromodorididae.

Distribution
This nudibranch was described from Malajibomanoc (Chicken Feather Island), Batangas Bay, Luzon Island, Philippines, . It is known only from the Philippines.

Description
Hypselodoris rositoi has a pink body with a white border to the mantle and foot. The rhinophores are orange, with pink-purple sheaths.

This species is large, reaching 50–60 mm in length.

References

Chromodorididae
Gastropods described in 2018